Hit the Highway was the third single for Australian country singer Kate Cook in 2014 who had a hit the previous year with "Give the Girl a Spanner.

Background
Cook had success the previous year with Give the Girl a Spanner. It made it into the Australian Tracks Top 30 and peaked at #3.

Cook went missing on March 3, 2019. She was found dead in bushland not far from her home in Lowood. Her death was not believed to be suspicious.

Chart performance
This song was from Cook's Hit the Highway EP. It peaked at No. 5 in May, during a 14-week chart run.

References

2013 songs
2013 singles